Henry Chauncey (February 9, 1905 – December 3, 2002) was a founder and the first president of the Educational Testing Service (ETS).

He graduated from Harvard College in 1928.

References

Further reading
 
 

1905 births
2002 deaths
20th-century American educators
Harvard College alumni